Frank Atlee Mason (April 12, 1862 – June 29, 1940) was an American college football coach and an attorney. He was the first full-time football coach at Harvard University.

Early life
Mason was born on April 12, 1862 in Newton, Massachusetts to David H. Mason and Sarah Wilson White. He attended Harvard University and played on the school's baseball and football teams. In football, he played quarterback and excelled at the quarterback kick. He graduated from Harvard in 1884 and later attended Harvard Law School and Boston University School of Law.

Coaching career
In the fall of 1886, Mason was named Harvard's head football coach by team captain William A. Brooks. This was the first time in school history that the football team had a full-time head coach (Lucius Littauer coached on several occasions in 1881, but did not coach the team full-time). The Crimson went 12–2 under Mason, but returned to coaching by captains the next season.

In 1907, Mason returned to coaching at Ole Miss. In Mason's only season as head coach, Ole Miss went 0–6. In what would be his final game as head coach, Ole Miss faced rival Mississippi A&M on a cold, wet Thanksgiving Day. Before the second half began, Mason brought out an urn filled with whisky-laced coffee in an attempt to warm his players. Sloppy second-half play resulted in a 15 to 0 Ole Miss loss. After the game, many of the players blamed Mason for the loss and when asked if the team was returning home that night, Mason was quoted as saying "Yes, the team is going north at 11 o'clock. I'm going in another direction, and hope I never see them again!"

Legal career
In 1888 Mason was admitted to the Suffolk County Bar. He had a law office at 31 Milk Street in Boston, where he practiced probate and conveyancing. From 1900 until his retirement in 1933 he was the legal counsel for Newton Savings Bank.

Personal life
Mason was the son of David H. Mason, an attorney and politician who served on the Massachusetts Board of Education, in the Massachusetts House of Representatives, and later as the United States Attorney for the District of Massachusetts. One of Mason's brothers was Edward Haven Mason, an attorney and philatelist. Mason was a direct descendant of John Winthrop.

Mason married Lilian Balch on October 6, 1897. They had two daughters, Mabel and Eleanor.

He died on June 29, 1940 in Newton, Massachusetts.

Head coaching record

References

External links
 

1862 births
1940 deaths
19th-century players of American football
American football quarterbacks
Harvard Crimson baseball players
Harvard Crimson football coaches
Harvard Crimson football players
Ole Miss Rebels football coaches
Boston University School of Law alumni
Harvard Law School alumni
Massachusetts lawyers
Sportspeople from Newton, Massachusetts
Players of American football from Massachusetts
Coaches of American football from Massachusetts
Baseball players from Massachusetts